Palaeochiropterygidae is a family of extinct bats. It was originally erected by the Swiss naturalist Pierre Revilliod in 1917 after discoveries of Palaeochiropteryx fossils from the Messel Pit of Germany. Palaeochiropterygidae was merged into Archaeonycteridae by Kurten and Anderson in 1980, but modern authorities specializing in bat fossils maintain the distinction between the two. It was classified to the unranked clade Microchiropteramorpha by Smith et al. in 2007.

They existed from the Ypresian to the Lutetian ages of the Middle Eocene epoch (55.8 to 40.4 million years ago).

Paleobiology 
Two species of Palaeochiropterygidae, Palaeochiropteryx tupaiodon and P. spiegeli, are known from complete skeletons from the famous Messel Pit fossil deposits in Germany. Palaeochiropteryx tupaiodon is the most common mammal found at Messel. All other species belonging to Palaeochiropterygidae are known only from isolated teeth and jaw fragments from Europe, India, Turkey, and possibly North America.

At Messel, the two species of Palaeochiropteryx are hypothesized to have occupied similar niches to living hipposiderids and rhinolophids that forage close to the ground and among vegetation. Wings with low aspect ratio and wing loading and preserved stomach contents of small moths and caddisflies support the idea that these palaeochiropterygids were slow but maneuverable fliers. The widespread distribution of Palaeochiropterygidae among the northern continents in the early and middle Eocene conflicts with the known morphology of P. tupaiodon and P. spiegeli, however, suggesting that other species of palaeochiropterygids had body plans much more suitable to long distance dispersal.

Evolutionary relationships 
Palaeochiropterygidae are generally considered to be the most advanced of the early bat families. Phylogenetic analyses have consistently shown Palaeochiropterygidae to be the closest relatives of the living, or crown, groups of bats. Most phylogenetic analyses only include species of fossil bats known from complete skeletons, so relationships of species within Palaeochiropterygidae are currently unknown.

Both Matthesia and Cecilionycteris may be junior synonyms of Palaeochiropteryx. Stehlinia has been previously considered to be a member of the superfamily Vespertilionoidea, possibly aligned with Natalidae or Kerivoulidae, but is now more commonly recognized as a palaeochiropterygid. Stehlinia, along with Lapichiropteryx and Anatolianycteris, possesses a very simple lower fourth premolar compared to other palaeochiropterygids and a close relationship between those three species has been proposed.

Genera
It contains the following genera. The list may be incomplete or inaccurate:

 Anatolianycteris Jones et al., 2018
Anatolianycteris insularis Jones et al., 2018 - Orhaniye Basin (Lutetian), Turkey
Cecilionycteris Heller, 1935
Cecilionycteris prisca Heller, 1935 - Geiseltal (Lutetian), Germany
Lapichiropteryx Tong, 1997
Lapichiropteryx xiei Tong, 1997 - Yuanqu Basin (Ypresian?), China

 Matthesia Sigé and Russell, 1980
 Matthesia insolita Sigé and Russell, 1980 - Geiseltal (Lutetian), Germany
 Matthesia germanica Sigé and Russell, 1980 - Geiseltal (Lutetian), Germany
Microchiropteryx Smith et al., 2007 
Microchiropteryx folieae Smith et al., 2007  - Vastan Lignite Mines (Ypresian), India
Palaeochiropteryx Revilliod, 1917
Palaeochiropteryx tupaiodon Revilliod, 1917 - Messel Pit (Lutetian), Germany
Palaeochiropteryx spiegeli Revilliod, 1917 - Messel Pit (Lutetian), Germany

 Stehlinia Revilliod, 1919
Stehlinia gracilis (Revilliod 1922) - Unknown locality, Quercy, France
 Stehlinia alia Maitre 2014 - Cuzal, Quercy (MP 13), France
 Stehlinia bonisi Sige 1990 - Le Garouillas, Quercy (MP 25), France
 Stehlinia minor (Revilliod 1922) - Unknown locality, Quercy, France
 Stehlinia pusilla (Revilliod 1922) - Egerkingen (MP 14?), Switzerland
 Stehlinia quercyi (Revilliod 1922) - Unknown locality, Quercy, France
 Stehlinia revilliodi Maitre 2014 - Cuzal, Quercy (MP 13), France
 Stehlinia rutimeyeri (Revilliod 1922) - Egerkingen (MP 14?), Switzerland

References

Bat families
Eocene bats
Eocene first appearances
Eocene extinctions